Loyetea is a rural locality in the local government area (LGA) of Central Coast in the North-west and west LGA region of Tasmania. The 2016 census recorded a population of 25 for the state suburb of Loyetea.

History 
Loyetea was gazetted as a locality in 1973. The locality was previously known as Milton or Lowana. Loyetea is believed to be an Aboriginal word for “love”. 

The locality is a mountainous area used for logging.

Geography
The Blythe River forms the western boundary.

Road infrastructure 
Route B17 (South Riana Road) passes to the north-east. From there, Loyetea Road provides access to the locality.

References

Towns in Tasmania
Localities of Central Coast Council (Tasmania)